Warszówka  is a village in Otwock County, Gmina Sobienie-Jeziory. As of 2007, the population was 330. From 1975 to 1998, the village was in Siedlce Voivodeship.

Villages in Otwock County